Dave Rodgers (born Giancarlo Pasquini; 21 February 1963) is an Italian singer, songwriter and producer known for his contributions to the Eurobeat genre of dance music. Born in Mantua, Italy, he formed the band Aleph before contributing to the long-running Super Eurobeat series. He owns Rodgers Studio and A-Beat C Productions alongside Alberto Contini.

In 2006, he released Blow Your Mind under the Rodgers alias, incorporating rock components in the album. In 2011, he left everything in the hands of Evelin Malferrari. During this time, Malferrari established a new Eurobeat label called Sun Fire Records, where Rodgers helped Malferrari to write a few songs.

In 2019, after a long legal battle with Futura Prince, he founded his own label Dave Rodgers Music and started producing a new catalogue, new videos and started collaborating and producing again with many artists like Kaioh, Annerley, Nuage, Domino, Powerful T, Norma Sheffield, Ace Warriors, Mickey B, Go Go Girls, Lou Grant, and Susan Bell.
 
Some of his songs, most notably "Déjà Vu", are featured in the anime Initial D, which contributed significantly to the popularity of Eurobeat music.

In 2022, he announced his upcoming album "MIDNIGHT RED."

He is also known by the aliases Derek Simon, Robert Stone, Patrick Hoolley, Mario Ross, Red Skins, RCS, Aleph, the Big Brother, and Thomas & Schubert.

Personal life 
Pasquini was married to Italo disco/Eurobeat artist Alessandra Mirka Gatti and has a son named Federico, who was raised by Gatti after their divorce, becoming involved in music activity as a Eurobeat singer under the stage name Kaioh (formerly known as Freddy Rodgers).

Discography

Singles and album tracks

1990s

2000s

2010s

As featured artist

Songs by Giancarlo Pasquini under the alias The Big Brother
"Soul Gasoline"
"Oh Oh Girls Are Dancing"
"Wild Reputation"
"Don't Go Breaking My Heart"
"Rock and Roll"
"Dancing in the Fire"
"Big Time"
"Ai No Corrida"
"September"
"Tears on My Eyes"
"Red Fire"
"L.A. Time"
"Knock on Wood"

Songs by Giancarlo Pasquini under other aliases
Raymond Barry - "Get Back"
Chester - "Right Time"
Dr. Money - "Give Up"
Patrick Hooley - "Catching Your Time"
Patrick Hooley - "Listen to Your Heart"
Tommy J - "Desire"
Manzi-Bellini - "In Your Eyes"
Billy Mappy - "Get It On"
Paul Murray - "Comedia"
Red Skins - "Dance Around the Totem"
Mario Ross - "More Illusions"
Mario Ross - "Push Push Ballerina"
RCS - "Rocking the City"
Robert Stone - "Black Cars"
Robert Stone - "Burning Heart"
Robert Stone - "Dance Girl"
Robert Stone - "Don't Give Up"
Robert Stone - "Pocket Time"
Robert Stone - "Welcome to the Jungle"
Roby Benvenuto - "Gringo"

References

External links
Official website

Musicians from the Province of Mantua
Living people
Italian male singers
Italian Italo disco musicians
English-language singers from Italy
Eurobeat musicians
Avex Trax artists
1963 births